Castle Rock is a home rule town that is the county seat and the most populous municipality of Douglas County, Colorado, United States. The town population was 73,158 at the 2020 United States Census, a 51.68% increase since the 2010 United States Census. Castle Rock is the most populous Colorado town (rather than city) and the 16th most populous Colorado municipality. Castle Rock is a part of the Denver-Aurora-Lakewood, CO Metropolitan Statistical Area and the Front Range Urban Corridor.

The town is named for the prominent, castle-shaped butte near the center of town.

History

The region in and around Castle Rock was originally home to the Arapaho and Cheyenne peoples. They occupied the land between the Arkansas and South Platte Rivers.

White settlers were drawn to the area by rumors of gold and by land opened through the Homestead Act of 1862. However, the discovery of rhyolite stone, not gold, ultimately led to the settlement of Castle Rock.

Castle Rock was founded in 1874 when the eastern Douglas County border was redrawn to its present location. Castle Rock was chosen as the county seat because of its central location.

One of the first homesteaders in the area near today's Castle Rock was Jeremiah Gould. At that time, the settlement consisted of just a few buildings for prospectors, workers, and cowboys. In 1874,  Gould donated  to the new town, which was also now home to the Douglas County government. Six streets named Elbert, Jerry, Wilcox, Perry, Castle, and Front were laid out to build the actual town of Castle Rock.

A new train depot brought the Denver and Rio Grande Railway to the area.

During the late 1800s and early 1900s, Castle Rock had a very active rhyolite quarrying industry. Many immigrants arrived in the area to work in the quarries.

In 1936, the town received a donation of land that included its namesake geographical feature. Men employed by the Works Progress Administration constructed a star atop the butte shortly after Castle Rock received that donation. The star was lit every year from 1936 to 1941. After World War II began, the star was left unlit as a symbol of sacrifice in support of the war effort. On August 14, 1945, shortly after V-J Day, the star was modified into a V-for-victory symbol. On December 7, 1945, the star was lit for the holiday season. It has been lit every year since around the same time.

The town's historic county courthouse, which was built in 1889–1890, burned down on March 11, 1978, the result of arson.

Castle Rock's municipal government experienced significant financial difficulties during the early 1980s. In 1984, the town's voters approved a charter amendment that authorized the creation of a home-rule charter commission. The home-rule charter was finalized in 1987.

The original Douglas County courthouse was one of seven buildings in Castle Rock that have been added to the National Register of Historic Places. The other buildings include Castle Rock Depot, Castle Rock Elementary School, First National Bank of Douglas County, Samuel Dyer House, Benjamin Hammer House, and Keystone Hotel.

A dispute about whether the Castle Rock Police Department was required to enforce a civil restraining order was decided by the U.S. Supreme Court in 2005. The court held, in Town of Castle Rock v. Gonzales, that a municipality cannot be held liable under a federal civil-rights statute, 42 U.S.C. § 1983, for failing to enforce civil restraining orders. The case had arisen from a 1999 murder of three young girls by their father outside the Castle Rock Police Department building. The children were abducted by their father, in violation of the restraining order that had been obtained by their mother, within several hours of being killed. The mother had asked the Castle Rock police to enforce the restraining order,
by finding and apprehending the father after he removed the children from her home and before the murders. Castle Rock police officers declined to do so, refusing even to contact the Denver Police Department after the mother notified them that the father had taken the children to an amusement park in that city.

Geography

Castle Rock is located at  (39.372212, −104.856090) at an elevation of 6,224 feet (1,897 m).

The town lies a few miles east of the Rampart Range of the Rocky Mountains on the western edge of the Great Plains. Castle Rock, the butte for which the town is named, is just north of the town center. Other prominent landforms visible from Castle Rock include Dawson Butte, Devils Head, Mount Evans, and Pikes Peak.

East Plum Creek, a stream within the South Platte River watershed, flows generally north through Castle Rock. Hangman's Gulch, which runs northwest then west around the north side of the town center, drains into East Plum Creek, as do multiple unnamed gulches in the southern and western areas of town. McMurdo Gulch and Mitchell Gulch run north then northeast through eastern Castle Rock and drain into Cherry Creek east of town.

Castle Rock is in the Colorado Foothills Life Zone. The hillsides are covered with meadows of grass, small plants, scattered juniper trees and open ponderosa pine woodlands. Other trees common in the area include Gambel oak (scrub oak or oak brush) and pinyon pine. Local wildlife includes the American badger, American black bear, bobcat, coyote, Colorado chipmunk, crow, garter snakes, gray fox, mountain cottontail rabbit, mountain lion, mule deer, pocket gopher, porcupine, skunk, and tadpoles. Birds found in the area include the golden eagle, peregrine falcon, sharp-shinned hawk, black-billed magpie, red-tailed hawk, pinyon jay, and western tanager.

Lying within the Front Range Urban Corridor, the town is part of the greater Denver metropolitan area. Castle Rock borders three communities, all to its north; from west to east, they are Castle Pines Village, the city of Castle Pines, and The Pinery. Other nearby communities include Franktown to the east, Larkspur to the south, Perry Park to the southwest, and Sedalia to the northwest.

Climate
Castle Rock has a semiarid climate (Köppen BSk) with cold, dry, snowy winters, and hot, wetter summers. January is the coldest month, July the hottest, and August the month with the most precipitation.

Given its location in the center of the state, it is expected that Castle Rock will experience continuing warming and higher average temperatures through the 21st century as the effects of climate change continue to be felt. Daily minimum temperatures are also expected to continue rising, as they have for the past 30 years. The town will also likely experience less snowfall, earlier snowmelt and runoff during the spring, and increased water uptake by plants.

Neighborhoods
Castle Rock's ZIP codes include many neighborhoods:

North of Downtown / West of I-25
 The Meadows
 Castle Pines Village 

Demographics

As of the 2010 census, there were 48,231 people, 16,688 households, and 12,974 families residing in the town. The racial makeup of the town was 90.7% White, 1.7% Asian, 1.1% African American, 0.6% American Indian, 0.1% Pacific Islander, 2.9% from other races, and 2.8% from two or more races. Hispanics and Latinos of any race were 10.0% of the population.

There were 16,688 households, out of which 48.4% had children under the age of 18 living with them, 65.4% were married couples living together, 3.9% had a male householder with no wife present, 8.5% had a female householder with no husband present, and 22.3% were non-families. 17.7% of all households were made up of individuals, and 4.0% had someone living alone who was 65 years of age or older. The average household size was 2.86, and the average family size was 3.27.

In the town, the population was spread out, with 32.4% under the age of 18, 5.8% from 18 to 24, 33.0% from 25 to 44, 22.6% from 45 to 64, and 6.2% who were 65 years of age or older. The median age was 33.8 years. For every 100 females, there were 98.5 males. For every 100 females age 18 and over, there were 95.5 males age 18 and over.

The median income for a household in the town was $85,461, and the median income for a family was $95,973. Males had a median income of $66,993 versus $47,087 for females. The per capita income for the town was $34,089. About 4.0% of families and 6.2% of the population were below the poverty line, including 8.2% of those under age 18 and 6.2% of those age 65 or over.

Castle Rock is the 16th most populous municipality in Colorado and is the center of the burgeoning urbanization of the county.

Economy
Because of its Front Range location between Denver and its inner suburbs and Colorado Springs, many of Castle Rock's residents commute nearly 20 miles to northern Colorado Springs or the Denver Technological Center, better known as "The Denver Tech Center" (DTC), which is an 18-mile drive north on I-25, with Downtown Denver roughly 30 miles north, and Denver International Airport about 45 miles north.

In fact, about 80% of Castle Rock residents commute out of town to work. The average one-way commute time for a Castle Rock resident is about 29 minutes, longer than the U.S. average.

One reason for this is that the town has not yet attracted the variety or extent of employers needed to significantly lower the number of commuters to work outside Castle Rock. The town has relatively little land zoned for industrial or light industrial use, with the vast majority of the land within town limits dedicated to residential construction only.

As of 2011, 78.2% of the population over the age of 16 was in the labor force, 0.4% was in the armed forces, and 77.7% were in the civilian labor force, with 72.6% employed and 5.1% unemployed. The employed civilian labor force was 48.0% in management, business, science, and arts; 25.8% in sales and office occupations; 14.7% in service occupations; 6.4% in natural resources, construction, and maintenance; and 5.2% in production, transportation, and material moving. The three industries employing the largest proportion of the working civilian labor force were educational services, health care, and social assistance (15.5%); professional, scientific, and management, and administrative and waste management services (13.2%); and finance and insurance, and real estate and rental and leasing (12.6%).

Castle Rock's cost of living is above average. Compared to a U.S. average of 100, the cost of living index for the town is 137.2.

As of mid-2019, the median home value in the town was $427,537. The median gross monthly rent for an apartment was about $1,461.

The town's housing base continues to grow. About 1,400 permits to build new homes were issued in 2018.

Government and politics

Castle Rock is a home rule municipality with a council–manager form of government. The Town's governing body is the Town Council, made up of seven members including the mayor and mayor pro-tem. Each councilmember is elected to represent an election district, and the mayor is elected to represent the Town at large. One member, appointed by the council, serves as the mayor pro-tem. Castle Rock voters approved a change to the town charter that authorized an at-large mayor in 2017.

The mayor presides over council meetings and casts one vote, like other councilmembers. The council sets policy for the town, adopts ordinances, approves the town budget, makes major land-use decisions, and appoints key town government staff including the town manager, town attorney, municipal judge, and members of town boards and commissions.

The town manager supervises all departments, prepares and implements the town budget, and works with the council to develop policies and propose new plans.

Tax revenues are used to provide general government, fire, police, parks maintenance and programs, street maintenance and operations, support for recreation, and planning and code enforcement services. The town also provides development services, golf, water, and sewer services to residents through self-supporting enterprise funds. The average annual municipal property tax bill of a Castle Rock resident is $40.66. That is in addition to property taxes assessed by Douglas County and other entities.

As the county seat, Castle Rock is the administrative center of Douglas County. The county courthouse, the Douglas County Justice Center, is north of downtown, and most departments of the county government base their operations in the town.

As of 2013, Castle Rock lies within Colorado's 4th U.S. Congressional District. The town is in the 4th district of the Colorado Senate and the 45th district of the Colorado House of Representatives.

Castle Rock is the county seat of Douglas County, a Republican stronghold in Colorado.

Education

Primary and secondary education
Douglas County School District is based in Castle Rock and operates 18 public schools in the town. These include ten elementary schools, two middle schools, two charter schools, one magnet school, one alternative high school, and two high schools: Castle View High School and Douglas County High School. In addition, there are three private primary schools in Castle Rock.

School board elections in Douglas County are held in odd-numbered years. In recent years the community has experienced a spirited debate between supporters of significant change in the management of local schools and those who oppose such changes or believe they should advance at a slower pace.

Libraries
The Douglas County Libraries public library system is based in Castle Rock, co-located with the local branch library, the Philip S. Miller Library, south of downtown. The Miller Library includes the Douglas County History Research Center and offers several educational and recreational programs to the public. Also, it includes Little Free Librarys places scattered throughout, such as in festival park.

Infrastructure

Transportation
Interstate 25 and U.S. Route 87 run concurrently north-south through Castle Rock. U.S. Route 85, also a north-south route, enters the town from the northwest, meeting I-25 at Exit 184; south of the exit, it runs concurrently with I-25 and U.S. 87. Colorado State Highway 86, an east-west route, enters Castle Rock from the east, then turns north and west as Founders Parkway, terminating at its junction with I-25 at Exit 184.

For local transportation within Castle Rock, the town government sponsors a voucher program for reduced-fare taxi service. This service is available to town residents who are disabled or who do not have access to a vehicle. In addition, the Castle Rock Senior Center offers a shuttle service for resident senior citizens.

Castle Rock does not participate in the Denver metropolitan area's Regional Transportation District. Municipal voters decided in November 2005 to opt the town out of RTD. As a result, neither bus nor light rail service to Denver or any of its other suburbs is available from Castle Rock.

BNSF Railway and Union Pacific Railroad each have a freight rail line that runs through Castle Rock. Both lines run parallel to U.S. 85.

Utilities and water
The Intermountain Rural Electric Association, based in nearby Sedalia, provides electric power. Black Hills Energy provides natural gas service. Waste Management and other businesses provide trash removal.

The town government's Utilities Department oversees water provision, distribution, and infrastructure maintenance. Historically, nearly all of the water needed by Castle Rock residents was pumped from aquifers below the ground, including the Denver Basin aquifer. Beginning in 2013, when the town developed its first strategic plan for the management of water, Castle Rock has moved toward more use of surface water. Between 2006 and 2018 per capita water use in Castle Rock declined from 137 gallons to 115 gallons.

Starting in 2020, Castle Rock expects to begin treating sink, tap, and toilet water to drinkable water quality standards so that it can be reused. The town aims to achieve a goal of reliance upon renewable water resources for 75% of municipal needs by 2050 and, by 2020, about one-third of all water used in Castle Rock is expected to be from a reusable source.

As of July 2019 Castle Rock, Denver, and Pitkin County are the first three Colorado municipal or county governments to adopt a state regulation governing greywater reuse.

Health care
Castle Rock has several medical offices, an urgent care, and an emergency room. Castle Rock Adventist Hospital, a full-service hospital, opened on August 1, 2013. The 50-bed hospital offers comprehensive health care to the Douglas County area, with labor and delivery suites, NICU, orthopedic surgery, ICU, and medical imaging.

Media

Castle Rock has a weekly newspaper, The Douglas County News-Press.

Castle Rock is part of the Denver radio and television market. Radio station KJMN is licensed to Castle Rock, but broadcasts from Denver playing a Spanish Adult Hits format on 92.1 FM. Denver radio station 850 KOA, which broadcasts a news/talk and sports format, operates its 50,000 watt transmitter from a site 10 miles northeast of downtown Castle Rock, in the town of Parker. Another Denver station, KAMP (1430 AM), a CBS Sports Radio affiliate with a Sports Radio format, operates its transmitter from Highlands Ranch, 13 miles north of downtown Castle Rock.

NPR programming can be heard on Colorado Public Radio's KCFR-FM. Castle Rock is also served by the AM signal of KGNU, a non-commercial affiliate of PRI, Pacifica, and the BBC World Service, and which also provides diverse music programming.

Television station KETD, an affiliate of the Estrella TV network, broadcasts on digital channel 46. Licensed to Castle Rock, the station is located near Centennial, Colorado.

Parks and recreation
Castle Rock's open space and parks comprise 27% the town's total land area ( of parks and open space /  total land area).

Culture

Points of interest
Philip S. Miller Park is the largest park project in Castle Rock. "Phase One" of the park was opened to the public on October 25, 2014. It remains under construction. The park is named after a local banker and philanthropist who, with his wife, Jerry, left trust monies to Castle Rock in the mid-1990s. The Phillip S. Miller Activity Center is included in the park's 300 acres.

The Castle Rock Historical Museum is in the former Denver and Rio Grande Railway depot building on Elbert Street. This building is purported to have been built in 1875. It is made of rhyolite taken from local quarries. The museum depicts how Castle Rock has changed over the years.

Sports
From 1986 through 2006, a professional golf tournament was held in Castle Pines Village. The International, a PGA Tour event, was held in August at the Castle Pines Golf Club.

Events

Castle Rock star lighting 
Since 1936, every Saturday before Thanksgiving, the Town of Castle Rock lights the  electric star upon Castle Rock. A lighting event is held downtown that night and is usually accompanied by a fireworks display. The star remains lit from the week before Thanksgiving to the end of the National Western Stock Show in January. This has changed multiple times, following World War II it was changed to a V, also, the same year as the Denver Broncos being in the Super Bowl, it was changed to orange and blue. Throughout part of the lockdown in early 2020 due to COVID-19, the star was relit as a symbol of unity.

Notable people
Notable individuals who were born in or have lived in Castle Rock include:
Amy Adams (born 1974), actress
Kirsten Bomblies (born 1973), biologist
 Kat Cammack - United States Representative for Florida's 3rd Congressional District
Jim Cottrell (born 1983), NFL linebacker
Gary Hallberg (born 1958), professional golfer
Beth Malone (born 1969), actress
Christian McCaffrey (born 1996), professional football player (running back)
Max McCaffrey (born 1994), professional football player (wide receiver)
Nelson Rangell (born 1960), jazz musician
Edward Seidensticker (1921–2007), Japanologist
Ann Strother (born 1983), WNBA player, coach

Gallery

See also

Colorado
Bibliography of Colorado
Index of Colorado-related articles
Outline of Colorado
List of counties in Colorado
List of municipalities in Colorado
List of places in Colorado
List of statistical areas in Colorado
Front Range Urban Corridor
North Central Colorado Urban Area
Denver-Aurora, CO Combined Statistical Area
Denver-Aurora-Lakewood, CO Metropolitan Statistical Area
Castle Rock v. Gonzales (2005), a U.S. Supreme Court case

References

External links

Town of Castle Rock website
CDOT map of the Town of Castle Rock
Visit Castle Rock

 
Towns in Douglas County, Colorado
Towns in Colorado
County seats in Colorado
Denver metropolitan area
1874 establishments in Colorado Territory
Populated places established in 1874